Lyubov Grigoryevna Polishchuk (21 May 1949 – 28 November 2006) was a popular Russian actress. She was born in the Siberian city of Omsk. After school she decided to become an actress and moved to Moscow. She made her debut in cinema in 1976 in the popular comedy film The Twelve Chairs in 1977, which was directed by Mark Zakharov. Lyubov Polishchuk died of bone cancer in Moscow in 2006, aged 57. She was buried at the Troyekurovskoye Cemetery.

Selected filmography

 The Twelve Chairs (1976) as dancer
 Zolotaya mina (1978) as Larisa Kovalyova
 31 June (1978, TV Movie) as Miss Quinn, hostess of The black horse
 The Very Same Munchhausen (1979, TV Movie) as Bertha, songstress
 Vavilon XX (1980) as Malva
 I Ask to Accuse Klava K. of My Death (1980) as Vera Sergeevna
 Vystrel v spinu (1980) as Yelena Vanina
 Bolshaya-malaya voyna (1980)
 Belyy voron (1981)
 Na chuzhom prazdnike (1981)
 Secret of the Black Birds (1983) as Adele Fortescue
  (1983)
  (1984) as Dasha
 Vyigrysh odinokogo kommersanta (1984)
 Dikiy veter (1985) as Nata
 Snake Catcher (1986) as Vera
 Raz na raz ne prikhoditsya (1987) as N. Smirnova
 The Christians (1987)
 Prezumptsiya nevinovnosti (1988) as Zoya Bolotnikova
 Proisshestviye v Utinoozyorske (1988)
 Korshuny dobychey ne delyatsya (1988)
 Intergirl (1989) as Zina Meleyko, prostitute
 Ya v polnom poryadke (1989) as Vera Konstantinova
 The Initiated (1989) as Mother
 Love with Privileges (1989) as Irina Vasilyevna Nikolaeva
 Fuflo (1989)
 Senit zon (1990)
 Papashka i mem (1990)
 My Seawoman (1990)
 Babnik (1990)
 Verbovshchik (1991)
 Terroristka (1991)
 Shchen iz sozvezdiya Gonchikh psov (1991)
 Semyanin (1991)
 Medovyy mesyats (1991)
 Tsena golovy (1992)
 Novyy Odeon (1992)
 Babnik-2 (1992)
  (1993) as Nadezhda Chekrygina
  (1993)
  (1993)
 Dafnis i Khloya (1993) as Clearisto / Mother
 Tretiy ne lishniy (1994)
 Koroli rossiykogo syska: Ubiystvo Buturlina (1994)
 Shirli-Myrli (1995) as Jennifer, USA Ambassador's wife
 Igra voobrazheniya (1995) as Rita Sergeyevna
 Impotent (1996)
 Ultimatum (1999) as Doctor
 Kadril (1999) as Lida Zvyagintseva
 Chivalric Romance (2000, TV Movie) as Irene Doukaina
 Still Waters (2000) as Pauline, Kashtanov's wife
 Den svyatogo Valentina (2000) as Lyuba
 Agent v mini-yubke (2000) as Nina
  (2001) as Galina Dorofeevna
  (2001)
  (2001)
  (2003)
  (2004) as Correspondent of a television channel
 My Fair Nanny (2004-2009, TV Series) as Lyubov Grigorevna Prutkovskaya
 Star of the Era (2005, TV Mini-Series) as Plavnikova
 Kill Carp (2005)
 '' (2013) as Lyusya Okopova, Stepanych's wife (final film role)

Honours and awards
 People's Artist of Russia (1994)
 Honoured Artist of Russia (1986)
 People's Artist of the Republic of Karelia (posthumously) (2007)

External links
 
 Russia-InfoCentre Obituary
 Lyubov Polishchuk bio at Lifeactor.ru 

1949 births
2006 deaths
Soviet film actresses
Russian film actresses
Actresses from Moscow
Actors from Omsk
Burials in Troyekurovskoye Cemetery
People's Artists of the RSFSR
Honored Artists of the RSFSR
Deaths from cancer in Russia
Deaths from bone cancer
20th-century Russian actresses
21st-century Russian actresses